This is a complete list of ice hockey players who have played for the Washington Capitals in the National Hockey League (NHL). It includes players that have played at least one game, either in the NHL regular season or in the NHL playoffs.

As of July 2018, 46 goaltenders and 536 skaters (forwards and defensemen) have appeared in at least one regular-season and/or playoff game with the Washington Capitals since the team joined the league in the 1974–75 NHL season. The 582 all-time members of the Capitals are listed below.

Eight former Washington Capitals players are enshrined in the Hockey Hall of Fame: Dino Ciccarelli, Adam Oates, Mike Gartner, Rod Langway, Larry Murphy, Scott Stevens, Phil Housley, and Sergei Fedorov. Jim Carey and Olaf Kolzig won the Vezina Trophy as the NHL's top goaltender while playing for Washington. Kolzig also won the King Clancy Memorial Trophy. Alexander Ovechkin won the Calder Memorial Trophy as NHL rookie of the year while playing for the Capitals. Doug Jarvis won the Frank J. Selke Trophy as the League's best defensive forward. Rod Langway won the James Norris Memorial Trophy, which is awarded to the League's top overall defenseman.

Key
  Appeared in a Capitals game during the 2021–2022 season.
  Hockey Hall of Fame member, Stanley Cup champion, or retired number.

The "seasons" column lists the first year of the season of the player's first game and the last year of the season of the player's last game. For example, a player who played one game in the 2000–01 season would be listed as playing with the team from 2000–2001, regardless of what calendar year the game occurred within.

Statistics complete as the end of the 2021 playoffs

Goaltenders

Skaters

Notes

References

 
 

Washington Capitals players

players